Saddlebag Island Marine State Park is a public recreation area made up of  Saddlebag Island, part of the San Juan Islands, in Skagit County, Washington. Dot Island and Huckleberry Island lie nearby. Saddlebag Island was held in private ownership until 1974, when the state purchased it for $192,000 for use as a state park.

Activities and amenities
Park activities include hiking, boating, crabbing, diving, saltwater fishing, swimming, water skiing, birdwatching, and wildlife viewing. The island has four primitive campsites, one of which is reserved for human- or wind-powered visitors on the Cascadia Marine Trail. The island has no mooring buoys or docks.

References

External links 
Saddlebag Island Marine State Park Washington State Parks and Recreation Commission 
Saddlebag Island Marine State Park Map Washington State Parks and Recreation Commission

State parks of Washington (state)
Parks in Skagit County, Washington
Protected areas established in 1974
1974 establishments in Washington (state)
San Juan Islands
Uninhabited islands of Washington (state)